Josh or Joshua Taylor may refer to:

 Josh Taylor (actor) (born 1943), American comedy and dramatic television actor
 Josh Taylor (baseball) (born 1993), American professional baseball pitcher
 Josh Taylor (boxer) (born 1991), Scottish professional boxer
 Josh Taylor (golfer) (1881–1957), English golfer
 Josh Taylor (Neighbours), a fictional character from the Australian soap opera Neighbours, portrayed by Liam Hemsworth
 Josh Taylor (YouTube personality), American internet comedy writer, director, and actor; co-creator of Blimey Cow
 Josh Taylor, member of the American band Half Alive
 Joshua Taylor, American film and television actor, producer, and director
 Joshua Taylor, an American police officer convicted for the murder of Jared Lakey